FELDA Soeharto or Kampung Soeharto is a FELDA settlement in Hulu Selangor District, Selangor, Malaysia. It was named in honor of the former Indonesian president Suharto, who visited this village in 1977, twelve years after the 1962–1966 Malaysian-Indonesian Confrontation.

See also
 FELDA Lyndon B. Johnson

Federal Land Development Authority settlements
Hulu Selangor District